is a Japanese football referee who has been a full international referee for FIFA.

Takayama became a FIFA referee in 2004. He also refereed in 2010 and 2014 FIFA World Cup qualifiers.

References 

1974 births
Living people
Japanese football referees